IIP refer to: Indian Institute Of Packaging

Organizations
Indian Institute of Packaging
Bureau of International Information Programs
Indian Institute of Petroleum
International Ice Patrol
International Institute for Peace
Investors In People
Irish Independence Party
International Inventories Programme

Science
Idiopathic interstitial pneumonia
Internet Imaging Protocol, an imaging protocol implemented on top of HTTP
Input Intercept Point (Signal Processing): IIP2 or IIP3
I2P, the Invisible Internet Project, an anonymous communications network
 II-p or IIp, a subtype of Type II supernova
 Ion imprinted polymer

Other uses
Interest in possession trust, a form of legal trust
International investment position
Index of industrial production
Canadian Immigrant Investor Program